The 1910 Copa del Rey Final (UECF) was the 8th final of the Spanish cup competition, the Copa del Rey (although technically there was no final, with the tournament being played as a mini-group of three teams). It was one of two rival Cup competitions played in that year due to disagreements between the reigning champion of the tournament, Club Ciclista de San Sebastián, and some of the clubs invited.

This was the "unofficial" competition, organised by the UECF (Unión Española de Clubes de Fútbol), in San Sebastián. Both its winner and that of the rival, the newly-created FEF (Federación Española de Fútbol), later Royal Spanish Football Federation in Madrid played two months later, are currently recognised as official by the RFEF.

The final was contested by Athletic Bilbao (then known as Athletic Club) and Vasconia, and was held at Ondarreta Stadium, San Sebastián on 20 March 1910. Athletic won the trophy for the third time in their history after defeating Vasconia 1–0. The only goal of the game was scored by Remigio Iza.

The tournament is believed to have been the first time Athletic Bilbao wore what became their regular red-and-white striped jersey, having recently imported the first set of kit from England (along with a set for their sister club, later known as Atletico Madrid).

Details

See also
1910 FEF Copa del Rey Final
1913 UECF Copa del Rey Final
Basque derby

References

Copa Del Rey Final
Copa del Rey Finals
Copa Del Rey Final 1910
Copa Del Rey Final 1910